The National Gallery Prague (NGP), formerly the National Gallery in Prague, is a state-owned art gallery in Prague, which manages the largest collection of art in the Czech Republic and presents masterpieces of Czech and international fine art in permanent and temporary exhibitions. The collections of the gallery are not housed in a single building, but are presented in a number of historic structures within the city of Prague, as well as other places. The largest of the gallery sites is the Trade Fair Palace (Veletržní Palác), which houses the National Gallery's collection of modern art. Other important exhibition spaces are located in the Convent of St Agnes of Bohemia, the Kinský Palace, the Salm Palace, the Schwarzenberg Palace, the Sternberg Palace, and the Wallenstein Riding School. Founded in 1796, it is one of the world's oldest public art galleries and one of the largest museums in Central Europe.

History

The history of the National Gallery dates back to the end of the 18th century (namely February 5, 1796), when a group of prominent representatives of Bohemian patriotic aristocracy (Kolowrat, Sternberg, Nostitz) and middle-class intellectuals decided to elevate what they called the "debased artistic taste" of the local population. The institution, which received the title Society of Patriotic Friends of the Arts, established the Academy of Fine Arts and the Picture Gallery. In 1918 the Picture Gallery became a central collection of newly formed Czechoslovakia.

In 1995 new spaces dedicated to 19th- and 20th-century art were opened in the refurbished Veletržní Palác (Trade Fair Palace), itself a national monument as Prague's largest functionalist building and one of the earliest examples of that architectural style in the city (construction began in 1925).

St George's Convent (Hradčany) was formerly used to display Art of the Middle Ages in Bohemia and Central Europe, baroque art, and the 19th-century art of Bohemia.

The collections

Old Masters
 Convent of St Agnes of Bohemia (Old Town) – Art of the Middle Ages in Bohemia and Central Europe
 Šternberk Palace (Hradčany) – European Art from Antiquity to the end of the Baroque period
 Schwarzenberg palace (Hradčany) – Baroque in Bohemia

19th-Century Art
 Salm Palace (Hradčany)

Modern and Contemporary Art

 Veletržní palác (Trade Fair Palace), Holešovice – 19th-, 20th-, and 21st-century art, the National Gallery's largest collection. Since 2012 Alfons Mucha's Slav Epic has been on display here.
The international collection includes numerous works by artists such as Picasso, Monet, Van Gogh, Rodin, Gauguin, Cézanne, Renoir, Schiele, Munch, Miró and Klimt; many of these are donations from the collection of art historian Vincenc Kramář.
Picasso, who has a spacious room to himself in the gallery, has two self-portraits there, and two of his nudes in addition to more abstract work. Works by Rodin, whose exhibition in Prague in the early 20th century had a profound impact on Czech sculpture for many years afterwards, include a series of busts and full-sized figure on a variety of subjects in the gallery.
The vast collection contains a large number of Czech and Slovak paintings and sculptures, including works by Alfons Mucha, Otto Gutfreund, František Kupka, T. F. Šimon, Tavik Frantisek Simon (1877-1942), Rudolf Fila, Vincenc Beneš and Bohumil Kubišta. Along with the Black Madonna House and the Museum Kampa, the Trade fair palace collection is one of the most notable collections of Czech Cubism in Prague. Notable works include Don Quixote by Gutfreund, Military Funeral by Beneš, an array of paintings by Kupka, covering almost all of the styles with which he experimented.

 House of the Black Madonna (Old Town) – Czech Cubism

Graphics Collection
 Kinský Palace (Old Town)

Oriental Art
 Kinský Palace (Old Town) – Art of Asia and Art of the Ancient World

On display outside Prague
 Kinský castle Žďár nad Sázavou – Baroque Art from the Collections of the National Gallery in Prague
 Fryštát castle in Karviná – 19th-century Czech art from the Collections of the National Gallery in Prague

Gallery

See also
List of museums in Prague
List of national galleries

References

External links 
 
 Collections of NGP
National Gallery Prague within Google Arts & Culture

1796 establishments in the Habsburg monarchy
1796 establishments in the Holy Roman Empire
18th-century establishments in Bohemia
Art museums and galleries in the Czech Republic
Museums in Prague
Prague